Like Minds is a 1998 jazz album by the vibraphonist Gary Burton with the pianist Chick Corea, guitarist Pat Metheny, drummer Roy Haynes, and double bass player  Dave Holland. In 1999, the album won a Grammy Award for Best Jazz Instrumental Performance, Individual or Group. Recordings took place in the Avatar Sound Studio in New York City.

Track listing

Personnel 
 Gary Burton – vibraphone
 Chick Corea – piano
 Pat Metheny – guitar
 Roy Haynes – drums
 Dave Holland – double bass

Charts 
Album – Billboard

Awards 
Grammy Awards

References

Sources and external links 
Reviews at All About Jazz
 
 

1998 albums
Gary Burton albums
Chick Corea albums
Pat Metheny albums
Roy Haynes albums
Dave Holland albums
Grammy Award for Best Jazz Instrumental Album